The Elmelunde Master, Danish Elmelundemesteren, is the designation given to the nameless 16th-century artist who painted the frescos in the churches of Elmelunde, Fanefjord and Keldby on the island of Møn in south-eastern Denmark.
 
The naves of these three churches were furnished with Gothic cross vaults at the end of the 15th century providing an ideal surface for frescos of the Biblia pauperum (or people's bible) based on popular stories from the richly illustrated medieval manuscripts of the Old and New Testaments.

The artist can be recognised from his distinctive emblem present in one or more of the frescos in all three churches. His warm colours ranging from dark red and russet to pastel shades of yellow, green, grey and black are distinctive as are the faces of his figures who all have sleepy eyes whether in scenes of heaven or hell. Vines, flowers and tree branches complete the images.

In the 16th century, following the Reformation, the frescos were covered with coats of whitewash which hid them from view until quite recently. It was in the 1880s that they were first rediscovered in the church at Elmelunde with the result that the artist became known as the Elmelunde Master. It is however the frescos in Fanefjord Church uncovered in the 1930s which are considered to be the most interesting and comprehensive.

The Elmelunde Master's school is also credited with the frescos in churches on the neighbouring island of Falster at Tingsted, Nørre Alslev, Kettinge and Åstrup.

See also
Church frescos in Denmark
Fanefjord Church
Keldby Church
Tingsted Church

External links 

 Elmelundemesteren from the Insula Moenia site. Retrieved 4 August 2007.
 Elmelundemesterens kirker from the Visit East Demark site (in Danish). Retrieved 4 August 2007.
 Kalkmalerier (i.e. frescoes) from the Elmelunde Church website (in Danish). Retrieved 4 August 2007.
 Tingsted Church site with articles on the frescoes and numerous photographs and explanations (in Danish). Retrieved 4 August 2007.
 Nørre Alslev Church site with images of the Elmelunde Master's work (in Danish). Retrieved 4 August 2007.

And the following images from Fanefjord Church:
 Fresco of the Three Kings from the Dansk Skaansk Forening
 Fresco of Mary with the infant Jesus from the Dansk Skaansk Forening
 Fresco of Eve tempting Adam in the Garden of Eden from Synde.dk
 Fanefjord Church: slideshow from Bierman Consult

Sources 

 Pastor Helge Buus: Fanefjord Kirke,  Fanefjord menighedsråd, Askeby, 1978, Fanefjord menighedsråd, 19 p.
 Birgit Als Hansen: De Mønske Kirker, Møns Turistforening, Stege, 1967, 11 p. (translated 1976 as The churches of Møn)
 Annett Scavenius: Elmelundemestern i Fanefjord Kirke, Forlaget Vandkunsten, 2010, 121 pages. .

Danish artists
Fresco painting
Anonymous artists
Church frescos in Denmark
Møn